Thomasia pygmaea, commonly known as tiny thomasia, is a species of flowering plant in the family Malvaceae and is endemic to southern Western Australia. It is a low, dense, compact shrub with broadly heart-shaped to egg-shaped or more or less round leaves and pink to purple flowers.

Description
The surface of the leaves is covered with pale or rust-coloured scales, densely so on the lower surface. The sepals are pink to purple and sparsely covered with scaly hairs. Flowering occurs from August to October.

Taxonomy and naming
This species was first formally described in 1852 by Nicolai Stepanovitch Turczaninow who gave it the name Asterochiton pygmaeus in Bulletin de la Société Impériale des Naturalistes de Moscou from specimens collected by James Drummond. In 1863, George Bentham changed the name to Thomasia pygmaea in Flora Australiensis. The specific epithet (pygmaea) means "dwarf".

Distribution and habitat
This thomasia grows in woodland and shrubland between the south of the Stirling Range and the west of Esperance in the Esperance Plains and Mallee bioregions of southern Western Australia.

Conservation status
Thomasia pygmaea is listed as "Priority Three" by the Government of Western Australia Department of Biodiversity, Conservation and Attractions, meaning that it is poorly known and known from only a few locations but is not under imminent threat.

Use in horticulture
Tiny thomasia is described as an attractive small shrub, useful for edging, container growing or in rockeries. It requires a light soil with good drainage and tolerates some shade and light frost.

References

Rosids of Western Australia
Plants described in 1806
pygmaea
Malvales of Australia
Plants described in 1852
Taxa named by Nikolai Turczaninow